Urša Pintar (born 3 October 1985) is a Slovenian racing cyclist, who most recently rode for UCI Women's WorldTeam . She has competed in the women's road race, at the UCI Road World Championships, on ten occasions between 2012 and 2022.

Major results
Source: 

2010
 National Road Championships
5th Time trial
6th Road race
2011
 National Road Championships
2nd Road race
4th Time trial
2012
 National Road Championships
2nd Time trial
3rd Road race
2013
 3rd Road race, National Road Championships
2014
 National Road Championships
2nd Road race
6th Time trial
 7th Giro dell'Emilia Internazionale Donne Elite
2015
 2nd Road race, National Road Championships
 7th Crescent Women World Cup Vårgårda TTT
 8th Team time trial, UCI Road World Championships
2016
 National Road Championships
1st  Time trial
2nd Road race
2017
 National Road Championships
1st  Time trial
4th Road race
 5th Giro dell'Emilia Internazionale Donne Elite
 7th Team time trial, UCI Road World Championships
2018
 National Road Championships
2nd Time trial
2nd Road race
 7th Giro dell'Emilia Internazionale Donne Elite
2019
 National Road Championships
2nd Time trial
2nd Road race
 4th Overall Vuelta a Burgos Feminas
 6th Durango-Durango Emakumeen Saria
 7th Mixed team relay, UCI Road World Championships
 8th Grand Prix de Plumelec-Morbihan Dames
2020
 1st  Road race, National Road Championships
 4th Giro dell'Emilia Internazionale Donne Elite
2021
 National Road Championships
2nd Time trial
2nd Road race
 10th Overall Tour de Feminin-O cenu Českého Švýcarska
2022
 National Road Championships
3rd Time trial
3rd Road race
 7th Time trial, Mediterranean Games

References

External links

1985 births
Living people
Slovenian female cyclists
Sportspeople from Ljubljana
Cyclists at the 2015 European Games
European Games competitors for Slovenia
Cyclists at the 2019 European Games